This is a list of songs that topped the Belgian Walloon (francophone) Ultratop 40 in 2007.

Best-Selling Singles 

This is the ten best-selling/performing singles in 2007.

See also
Ultratop 50 number-one hits of 2007
2007 in music

References

Ultratop 40
Belgium Ultratop 40
2007